Ridgebury is a census-designated place (CDP) in the town of Ridgefield, Fairfield County, Connecticut, United States. It occupies the north end of the town of Ridgefield and is bordered to the north and northeast by the city of Danbury and to the west by Putnam and Westchester counties in New York. The name is a portmanteau of Ridgefield and Danbury. All political power in Ridgebury is currently held by the government of Ridgefield. 

Ridgebury was first listed as a CDP prior to the 2020 census. Early in its history, Ridgebury tried to secede from Ridgefield, however, this effort failed. Today, many Ridgeburians feel that the government of Ridgefield neglects to address much needed infrastructure repairs in Ridgebury, and thus there is a growing animosity between Ridgebury and Ridgefield. Some Ridgeburians have gone so far as to support the creation of an independent Town of Ridgebury with complete political separation from Ridgefield. Compared to the rest of Ridgefield, the infrastructure of Ridgebury is worse off due to neglect from the town government. Frequent potholes on Ridgeburian roads, particularly on Ridgebury road, has been a pressing issue in the village of Ridgebury. For many Ridgeburians, the lack of road repairs is the main source of frustration between them and the Ridgefield government. In October of 2021, posters advocating for Ridgeburian independence were placed around the Ridgebury area.

References 

Census-designated places in Fairfield County, Connecticut
Census-designated places in Connecticut